Camino may refer to:

Places
Camino, California, United States, a census-designated place
Camino, Piedmont, Italy, a town
Camino, Veneto, Italy, a town

People
Jaime Camino (1936–2015), Spanish film director and screenwriter
Renae Camino (born 1986), Australian basketball player

Films
Camino (2008 film), a Spanish film
Camino (2015 film), an American film

Music
Camino (band), a Japanese rock band
Camino (album), a 2014 album recorded by violinist Oliver Schroer in churches along the Camino de Santiago pilgrimage route
Camino Records, a record label
88Camino, a Canadian rapper, singer, and songwriter

Other uses
Camino (web browser), a discontinued web browser for OS X
Camino, also titled The Way, a religious book by Josemaría Escrivá
Camino Island and Camino Winds, novels by John Grisham

See also

 El Camino (disambiguation)
 Camino al Tagliamento, a town in Italy
 Camino de Santiago, a pilgrimage route in France and Spain
 Comino (disambiguation)
 Kamino (disambiguation)
 The Band Camino, American rock band